This page lists public opinion polls conducted for the 2019 Guatemalan general election, which was held in on 16 June 2019. Because no candidate won a majority, a run-off occurred on 11 August 2019.

Second round

Alternative scenarios

First round

After resolutions

Before resolutions

Favorable or unfavorable opinions

Favorable opinions

Unfavorable opinions

Most favorite for president

Least favorite for president

References

2019
2019